Cochrane Perkasa High School (Malay: Sekolah Menengah Kebangsaan Cochrane Perkasa) is a co-ed secondary school. The school is widely known as SMKCP and the students of SMK Cochrane Perkasa bear the name Cochrane Perkasan. 

SMKCP is famous for its high achievement in academics, sports and other activities for a new secondary school level in Malaysia. It is considered one of the best non-residential schools in Malaysia. The school building is a single block, eight-storey building.

SMKCP are consisted of one primary schools and a secondary school. The primary schools are formally known in Malay today as Sekolah Rendah Kebangsaan Cochrane Perkasa while the secondary school is called Sekolah Menengah Kebangsaan Cochrane Perkasa. They shared the same field for the usage of sports and curriculum activities.

History and Achievements

2004
 SMK Cochrane Perkasa was officially launched.

2006
 The school was relocated at a new nine-storey building at Jalan Cochrane.
 The U-15 boy hockey team won the 2nd place in the zone championship and 3rd place in the MSSMKL.
 Hang Jebat(GREEN) won the School Sports Day.

2007
 The Under-15 boy hockey team won the first place in the zone championship, while the girl Under-15 hockey team won the 2nd place.
 Hang Jebat(GREEN) won the School Sports Day.
 12 student get straight A for PMR in 2007.

2008
 Puan Siti Zarinah Che Omar was appointed to be the principal of the school, replacing Puan Hjh Rokiah bte Yaacob.
 Hang Tuah(BLUE) won the School Sports Day for the 1st time.
 The school Under-18 and Under-15 boy hockey team won the first and second place respectively in zone championship, while the girl Under-18 hockey team won the 3rd place.
 The Under-18 football team won the 3rd place in the zone championship.
 Cross-country has been held on 11 April 2008
 The school badminton team won the first place in MSSMKL championship.
 Handball team won the second place in the zone championship.
 The school won the first place in Qur'an reciting competition.
 Dikir barat team win the third place in Anti-Dadah Competition.
 10 students got straight As for PMR in 2008.

2009
 Cross-country has been held on 14 February 2009.
 School Sports Day has been held on 13 March 2009 and Hang Tuah (blue) has won.
 Five students got straight As for PMR in 2009

2005 establishments in Malaysia
Educational institutions established in 2005
Schools in Kuala Lumpur
Secondary schools in Kuala Lumpur